Umphrey's McGee is an American progressive rock / jam band based in Chicago, Illinois, and founded in South Bend, Indiana, at the University of Notre Dame in 1997 by vocalist/guitarist Brendan Bayliss, bassist Ryan Stasik, keyboardist Joel Cummins, and drummer Mike Mirro. Their discography consists of seven studio albums (including a two-disc set of demos and studio leftovers), ten official live albums, two extended play, and four video albums. The band is known for their live shows and extensive touring, and nearly every live show they have performed is recorded and made available for purchase on CD or as a digital download.

Umphrey's McGee's first three albums are currently out of print in physical format. Their first proper recording, Local Band Does OK, was released in 2002, and the companion live album, Local Band Does OKlahoma, in 2003. Anchor Drops followed in 2004, the band's first release on an official record label. 2006 saw the release of Safety In Numbers, which charted at number 186 on the US Billboard 200, and featured artwork by Storm Thorgerson, known for his work with such artists as Pink Floyd, Led Zeppelin, Dream Theater, and Muse. Demos and leftover tracks from Safety in Numbers were released in 2007 as a two-disc set titled The Bottom Half. Between 2007 and 2008, the band released two official two-disc live albums, Live at the Murat and Jimmy Stewart 2007, the latter being a compilation of live improvisations from selected shows. Mantis was released in 2009, and Death by Stereo in 2011, both receiving moderate chart success. Tracks from Death by Stereo were remixed and released as the EP Death by Remix in 2012.

Studio albums

Live albums

Singles and EPs

Video albums

References

External links 

Official band website

Rock music group discographies
Discographies of American artists
Discography